Ibrahima Gueye (born 19 February 1978) is a Senegalese former professional footballer who played as a defender.

Career
Gueye started his professional playing career with Dakar UC in Senegal before joining another Senegalese club, AS Douanes. During the summer of 2001, he made his first step into European football as he signed a contract with Bulgarian record title holder CSKA Sofia. Gueye won two national titles during his spell at CSKA Sofia, in 2003 and 2005.

Gueye was later transferred to Turkish Second Division side Samsunspor in February 2006, only to sign with Serbian club Red Star six months later. In the winter of 2009, he joined Al-Ahli Jeddah. After playing for Lokeren for 3 years, he then signed a one-year contract with Serbian side Radnicki Niš.

He has been capped twice with Senegal national football team, which is one of the reasons he was never selected to play for Bulgaria despite some coaches expressing a wish to call him up to the European country's national team. Initially (in 2006) Gueye declined invitations to play for Bulgaria. In February 2008, he declared himself available and was called up for a friendly match against Finland, but was subsequently (before making a debut) found ineligible by FIFA due to his previous appearances for Senegal youth.

Following his retirement in 2014, Gueye has mainly been based in Belgium, but he regularly returns to Senegal. He has turned to business and owns a factory in Dakar that specializes in the production of mango juice in addition to being engaged in animal husbandry.

Personal life
Gueye has dual Bulgarian and Senegalese citizenship. He has had 2 children with his ex-wife Fatou Touré. The oldest Marième Gueye (15 years old) and second son Jupiter Amadou Gueye (13). He divorced with Fatou Touré in 2016. He currently lives in Senegal and his children live in Belgium together with their mother.

Honours
Lokeren
Belgian Cup: 2011–12
 Cska Sofia 
Bulgarian A PFG: 2002–03, 2004–05

Red Star Belgrade
Serbian SuperLiga: 2006–07
Serbian Cup: 2006–07

References

1978 births
Living people
Footballers from Dakar
Senegalese footballers
Senegal international footballers
Association football defenders
AS Douanes (Senegal) players
PFC CSKA Sofia players
First Professional Football League (Bulgaria) players
Expatriate footballers in Bulgaria
Samsunspor footballers
Süper Lig players
Expatriate footballers in Turkey
Red Star Belgrade footballers
FK Radnički Niš players
Serbian SuperLiga players
Expatriate footballers in Serbia
Expatriate footballers in Saudi Arabia
K.S.C. Lokeren Oost-Vlaanderen players
Belgian Pro League players
Expatriate footballers in Belgium
Senegalese expatriate footballers
Senegalese expatriate sportspeople in Turkey
Senegalese expatriate sportspeople in Bulgaria
Senegalese expatriate sportspeople in Belgium
Senegalese expatriate sportspeople in Serbia
Senegalese expatriate sportspeople in Saudi Arabia
Al-Ahli Saudi FC players
Saudi Professional League players